Sergio Marelli (24 May 1926 – 22 July 2006) was an Italian basketball player. He competed in the men's tournament at the 1952 Summer Olympics.

References

1926 births
2006 deaths
Italian men's basketball players
Olympic basketball players of Italy
Basketball players at the 1952 Summer Olympics
Sportspeople from Varese